Nell Soto (June 18, 1926 – February 26, 2009) was an American politician. Soto represented the 61st Assembly district (including parts of Los Angeles and San Bernardino Counties and the cities of Ontario, Pomona, Chino and Montclair) from 1998 to 2000 and again from 2006 to 2008. She served two terms as a state senator for the 32nd district from 2000 to 2006.

Soto served on the Pomona city council from 1986 until 1998. Soto also served on the South Coast Air Quality Management District. She was the first Latina from the San Gabriel Valley to be elected to that position. In 2006, she authored legislation that included expansion of the Nell Soto Teacher Involvement program, improving foster care licensing, and improving welfare to work programs.

Soto was married to Phil Soto, a pioneering Latino politician in California's history. Soto died February 26, 2009, after months of declining health.

Media coverage

 
In 2007, Soto was criticized for not being in Sacramento for 25 days while she was out sick, and collecting a total of $22,032 as a per diem. This money is a standard amount paid out to legislators not just for travel and living expenses , as she was criticized for, but also to pay for district office space, utilities, and staff resources etc.  An assembly member maintains two offices, one in Sacramento and one in the district. Soto maintained these offices and staff during her recuperation period, and did not just use the money as accused by the reporter for personal apartment rent as alleged. "The rent for the apartment (and her offices) wasn't waived by the landlords" while she was at home recuperating, as explained by Greg Schmidt, the Secretary of the California State Senate.

References

External links
Join California Nell Soto

Members of the California State Assembly
California state senators
1926 births
2009 deaths
Women state legislators in California
California city council members
20th-century American politicians
People from Pomona, California
20th-century American women politicians
21st-century American politicians
21st-century American women politicians
Women city councillors in California